Bhusawar is a city and a municipality in Bharatpur district in the state of Rajasthan, India.

Location
Bhusawar is situated about 55 km from Bharatpur and 138 km from state capital Jaipur. Bhusawar is the Tehsil Headquarter of Bhusawar Tehsil of Bharatpur district. It is famous for pickles.

References

Cities and towns in Bharatpur district